Pierre de Lagarde (25 March 1932 – 15 November 2022) was a French historian and television producer and director. He devoted his career to the protection and enhancement of the architectural heritage of France. He produced and directed the show , broadcast from 1962 to 1974 and 1976 to 1992.

Biography
At the age of 16, de Lagarde began hitchhiking, visiting churches and castles. It quickly became very popular with French audiences. However, the broadcast was halted in 1974 following a dispute with the Minister of Justice. It resumed in 1976 and continued until de Lagarde's retirement in 1992.

From 2001 to 2006, de Lagarde directed Église de France on KTO, which discussed historic religious buildings in France. Throughout his career, he received tens of thousands of letters detailing important, endangered historical buildings in France. In 1964, he was made a Knight of the Ordre des Arts et des Lettres and in 1990, a Knight of the Legion of Honour.

De Lagarde died in Paris on 15 November 2022, at the age of 90.

Publications
Chefs-d'œuvre en péril (1964)
Guide des chefs-d'œuvre en péril (1967)
Guide des chefs-d'œuvre en péril : Île-de-France (1969)
La mémoire des pierres (1980)
Vie et histoire du XVIIIe arrondissement (1996)
Le Grand duel (1997)
L'amour dans tous ses états (2001)
Dictionnaire inattendu des témoins de l'invisible (2009)
La Pesée des âmes (2012)
Le Grand cirque : souvenirs romancés (2015)
Dictionnaire amoureux du patrimoine (2019)

References

1932 births
2022 deaths
French film directors
French producers
French television personalities
French historians
People from Meudon
Chevaliers of the Légion d'honneur
Chevaliers of the Ordre des Arts et des Lettres